The following is a list of events affecting Philippine television in 1980. Events listed include television show debuts, finales, cancellations, and channel launches, closures and rebrandings, as well as information about controversies and carriage disputes.

Events
 January 15 – RPN 9 starts nationwide satellite broadcasts via DOMSAT.

Premieres

Unknown dates

Unknown
Karnabal Dos on BBC 2
Ladies and Gentlemen on BBC 2
NewsCenter 4 on MBS 4
Tele-Aralan ng Kakayahan on MBS 4
Musika ng Lahi on MBS 4
National Hockey League on MBS 4
1980 Moscow Olympic Games on MBS 4
Pilita & Eddie on GMA
Who Knows That? on GMA
Guidelines with Dr. Harold J. Sala on GMA
Heartbeat on GMA
Knots Landing on GMA
The Persuaders! on GMA
Benson on GMA
That's Incredible on GMA
Lucky Stars on RPN 9
Duplex on RPN 9
Joey and Son on RPN 9
Sealab 2020 on RPN 9
C.U.T.E. (Call Us Two for Entertainment) on IBC 13
 T.O.D.A.S.: Television's Outrageously Delightful Afternoon Show on IBC 13
Friday Night at the Movies on IBC 13
Teen Star on IBC 13
Jimmy Swaggart on IBC 13
Guni Guni on GMA
Champoy on RPN 9

Finales

Unknown
Barkada sa 9 on RPN 9
Pipwede on RPN 9
Dial OCR on RPN 9

Births
January 15 - Sam Oh, TV host and radio DJ
January 16 - Drew Arellano, TV host and actor
February 7 - Adrian Alandy, actor
February 8 - Jenny Miller, Canadian-Filipino actress
March 1 – Cassandra Ponti, Filipina actress, dancer, and model
May 13 - Mau Marcelo, singer and winner of Philippine Idol
July 6 – JB Magsaysay, actor, businessman and politician
August 2 – Dingdong Dantes, Filipino actor
August 17 – Tootsie Guevara
October 1 – Phoemela Baranda, TV host
October 5 – LJ Moreno, actress
December 2 - Thor Dulay, singer

See also
1980 in television

References

 
Television in the Philippines by year
Philippine television-related lists